Nigel Deonarine Dharamlall (born Guyana) is a Guyanese politician. He is the current Guyanese Minister of Local Government and Regional Development in Guyana. Dharamlall was sworn into President Irfaan Ali's cabinet. He was appointed Minister in August 2020.

References 

Living people
Members of the National Assembly (Guyana)
Government ministers of Guyana
People's Progressive Party (Guyana) politicians
South American political people
Year of birth missing (living people)
21st-century Guyanese politicians
Guyanese people of Indian descent